This is a comprehensive listing of Soilwork's members.

Current lineup 
Björn "Speed" Strid

Active: 1995–present
Instrument: Vocals
Release contributions: All Soilwork releases
Note: Also the lead singer for bands The Night Flight Orchestra, Terror 2000 and Coldseed, and on Darkane's demo and Disarmonia Mundi's albums Fragments of D-Generation, Mind Tricks and The Isolation Game. Guest appearance on Zero Tolerance's "Prime Time Mind Surgery" in late 2006.

Sven Karlsson

Active: 2001–present
Instrument: Keyboards
Release contributions: All Soilwork releases from Natural Born Chaos (2002)
Note: Played keyboards and synthesizer for Evergrey and keyboards for Embraced

Sylvain Coudret

Active: 2008–present
Instrument: Guitars
Release contributions: All Soilwork releases from The Panic Broadcast (2010)
Note: Live guitarist during 2008 summer festivals. Officially joined Soilwork as a permanent member on 18 September 2008 replacing former guitarist Ola Frenning, also plays in French death metal band Scarve.

Bastian Thusgaard

Active: 2016–present
Instrument: Drums
Release contributions: All Soilwork releases from Verkligheten (2019)
Note: Was a student of previous Soilwork drummer Dirk Verbeuren.

Rasmus Ehrnborn
Active: 2022–present
Instrument: Bass
Release contributions: Overgivenheten (2022)
Note: Was a touring bassist from 2019 until January 2022 when he was announced as the band's official bassist.

Simon Johansson
Active: 2023-present
Instrument: Guitars
Release contributions: None
Note: Was a touring guitarist from 2019 until March 13th, 2023 when it was announced that he became an official member, replacing the late David Andersson.

Former members

Session musicians

Timeline

References

Soilwork